James Robert Auer (born January 4, 1962) is a former American football defensive end who played for the Philadelphia Eagles in 1987. He played college football at University of Georgia.

Auer played prep football at Washington Township High School in Washington Township, Gloucester County, New Jersey.

References 

1962 births
Living people
American football defensive ends
Georgia Bulldogs football players
Philadelphia Eagles players
National Football League replacement players
Players of American football from New Jersey
Players of American football from Philadelphia
People from Washington Township, Gloucester County, New Jersey
Sportspeople from Gloucester County, New Jersey
Washington Township High School (New Jersey) alumni